Stackpole and Castlemartin is a community in Pembrokeshire, Wales,  south of Pembroke.

It was formed in 2011 by the amalgamation of the existing communities of Stackpole and Castlemartin, and includes a number of other smaller villages and ancient parishes in the area. The population of the community upon formation was 632, including Bosherston, Warren and St Twynnels. The area includes the military Castlemartin Training Area.

There are more than 70 listed buildings in the community.

References

Communities in Pembrokeshire